Lefty's is a retail store on Pier 39 in San Francisco, specializing in products for left-handed people. It was opened in 2008 by Margaret Majua. However, the history of a left-handed store on Pier 39 dates back to 1975, with the opening of Left-Hand World, which closed ten years later. The product line, all designed by Majua, include stationery products, such as notebooks with the binding on the right side, and a pen which allows left-handed writers to see what they had just written without smearing it;   cooking utensils for the left hand; and clothing with slogans for left-handers. Lefty's, which sells its products both in-store and online, is one of just a few stores for left-handed people worldwide, and currently the oldest.

References

External links 

2008 establishments in California
Retail companies based in California
Handedness
Companies based in San Francisco
American companies established in 2008
Retail companies established in 2008